Séranvillers-Forenville is a commune in the Nord department in northern France.

See also
Communes of the Nord department

References

Seranvillersforenville